Senator Bookout may refer to:

Jerry Bookout (1933–2006), Arkansas State Senate
Paul Bookout (born 1962), Arkansas State Senate